Craspedoxantha yarivi is a species of tephritid or fruit flies in the genus Craspedoxantha of the family Tephritidae.

Distribution
Tanzania.

References

Tephritinae
Insects described in 1999
Diptera of Africa